Farquharson Nunatak is a nunatak  northwest of Mount Lombard on Sobral Peninsula, on the Nordenskjöld Coast of Antarctica. The nunatak is surmounting Mundraga Bay to the west.  It was named by the UK Antarctic Place-Names Committee after Geoffrey W. Farquharson, a British Antarctic Survey geologist who worked in this area in the 1979–80 and 1980–81 field seasons.

References 

Nunataks of Graham Land
Nordenskjöld Coast